Malampa Revivors is an association football club from Luganville, Vanuatu. The club is the most successful club outside of Port Vila.

History
Malampa Revivors was founded in 2010 by Elder Shem Dahmassing, as a youth ministry within the Youth Fellowship program of Centenary Presbyterian Church, at Sarakata in Luganville. The club has its focus on promoting and bringing up youths in religious aspects, together with football. Most of the current players still attend the Youth Fellowship of Presbyterian Church.
In 2015 Malampa Revivors FC made headlines when they reached the final of the 2015 VFF National Super League after a 2-1 victory over Port Vila topclub Ifira Black Bird. In the final they lost to Amicale but because of the new format of the OFC Champions League, in which has been decided that two Vanuatu clubs will play at the OFC Champions League Malampa also qualified for the OFC Champions League. When the final was played this had not been announced yet. But it means that Malampa Revivors will play at the 2017 OFC Champions League for the first time.

Achievements
Continental
OFC Champions League:
2019 OFC Champions League:
2017 OFC Champions League: Participating for the first time.

National
VFF National Super League:
Winners (1): 2014
Runners up (1): 2015
Third(1): 2016
Runners up (1): 2017

Area League
Luganville League Premiere Division
Champions (3): 2014, 2015, 2016
Runners up (2): 2012, 2013

Brisk Cup
Champions (2): 2011, 2013

Jules Cup
Champions (1): 2016

Independence Cup
Champions (2): 2013, 2014

Rivalry
Malampa Revivors FC's rival is Vaum United in a domestic level. It is the only club in the Luganville Football League to have clashed with the team in numerous tournament finals.

Current squad
Squad for 2020 OFC Champions League

Coaching staff

Medical staff

Media staff

Managers 
 Steve Ham (2011-2016)
 Percy Avock (2016-2017)
 Kaison Maki (2019)

References

 
 
http://www.yumitoktokstret.com/malampa-revivors-sets-vanuatu-history/

Football clubs in Vanuatu